Joe Stimson (born 2 December 1995) is an Australian professional rugby league footballer who plays as a  forward for the Gold Coast Titans in the NRL.

He previously played for the Melbourne Storm in the National Rugby League, with whom he made a grand final appearance.

Early life
Stimson was born in Temora, New South Wales, Australia. He is the son of former South Sydney Rabbitohs player Peter Stimson and nephew of former Balmain and Wests Tigers player Mark Stimson.

Stimson played his junior rugby league for the Temora Dragons. He was than educated at St Gregory's College, Campbelltown before being signed by the Melbourne Storm.

Playing career

Early career
In 2014 and 2015, Stimson played for the Melbourne Storm's NYC team, captaining the side in 2015. In July 2015, he played for the New South Wales under-20s team against the Queensland under-20s team. In August 2015, he re-signed with the Storm on a 2-year contract until the end of 2017. In 2016, he graduated to the Storm's Queensland Cup team, Sunshine Coast Falcons.

2017
In round 2 of the 2017 NRL season, Stimson made his NRL debut for the Melbourne side against the New Zealand Warriors. A few days later, he re-signed with Melbourne on a two-year contract until the end of 2019.

2018
Stimson was part of the Melbourne team that played in the 2018 NRL Grand Final against the Sydney Roosters but lost 21–6.

2019
On 4 June, Stimson signed a three-year deal with the Canterbury-Bankstown Bulldogs from 2020. In round 22, Stimson played his 50th NRL game for the Storm in their 18–22 loss to the Canberra Raiders at AAMI Park in Melbourne.

2020
Stimson made his debut for Canterbury-Bankstown in round 1 of the 2020 NRL season against arch rivals Parramatta.  Canterbury would go on to lose the match 8–2.

On 29 April, Stimson was ruled out for the entire 2020 NRL season due to a shoulder injury which required surgery.

2021
Stimson played 11 games for Canterbury in the 2021 NRL season which saw the club finish last and claim the Wooden Spoon.

2022
Stimson made a total of 21 appearances for Canterbury throughout the 2022 season. The club would finish 12th on the table and miss the finals.
On 30 September, Stimson signed a two-year deal to join the Gold Coast starting in 2023.

References

External links
Canterbury Bulldogs profile
Melbourne Storm profile
Storm profile

1995 births
Living people
Australian rugby league players
Melbourne Storm players
Sunshine Coast Falcons players
Rugby league second-rows
Rugby league locks
Rugby league players from Temora, New South Wales
Canterbury-Bankstown Bulldogs players
Gold Coast Titans players